Azteca coeruleipennis is a species of ant in the genus Azteca. Described by Emery in 1893, the species is endemic to several countries in North America and Central America.

References

Azteca (genus)
Hymenoptera of North America
Insects described in 1893